Rahmatnagar is a village in Gosainganj block of Lucknow district, Uttar Pradesh, India. As of 2011, its population is 3,618, in 687 households. It is the seat of a gram panchayat, which also includes the villages of Seephatanagar and Lakhpera.

References 

Villages in Lucknow district